The 1968–69 DDR-Oberliga was the 20th season of the DDR-Oberliga, the first tier of league football in East Germany.

The league was contested by fourteen teams. National People's Army club  FC Vorwärts Berlin won the championship, the club's last of six East German championships. It marked, together with a cup win in the following season, the last highlight in the club's history as, two seasons later, Vorwärts was moved from East Berlin to Frankfurt/Oder for political reasons and never again won another national title after the move.

Gerd Kostmann of F.C. Hansa Rostock was the league's top scorer with 18 goals, while Eberhard Vogel of FC Karl-Marx-Stadt won the seasons East German Footballer of the year award.

On the strength of the 1968–69 title Vorwärts qualified for the 1969–70 European Cup where the club was knocked out by Feyenoord in the quarter finals. Third-placed club 1. FC Magdeburg qualified for the 1969–70 European Cup Winners' Cup as the seasons FDGB-Pokal winner and was knocked out by  Académica de Coimbra in the second round. Second-placed FC Carl Zeiss Jena qualified for the 1969–70 Inter-Cities Fairs Cup where it was knocked out in the quarter finals by Ajax while fourth-placed F.C. Hansa Rostock was knocked out by Inter Milan in the second round.

Table									
The 1968–69 season saw two newly promoted clubs Berliner FC Dynamo and BSG Stahl Riesa.

Results

References

Sources

External links
 Das Deutsche Fussball Archiv  Historic German league tables

1968-69
1
Ober